Shankou may refer to:

China 

 Shankou, Hepu County, Guangxi
 Shankou, Longyao County, Hebei
 Shankou, Xiushui County, in Xiushui County, Jiangxi
 Shankou, Tai'an, in Daiyue District, Tai'an, Shandong
 Shankou, Qingtian County, Zhejiang
 Burqin Shankou Dam,  dam in Burqin County, Xinjiang, China
 Haba River Shankou Dam, dam in Habahe County, Xinjiang, China

Japan 

 Yamaguchi in Chinese Pinyin